Lunella coronata, common name the crowned turban shell or the coronate moon turban, is a species of sea snail, a marine gastropod mollusk in the family Turbinidae, the turban snails.

Description
The shell grows to a length of 4 cm, with conspicuous flattened, cup-like scales interspersed by small, regular rows of nodules. The colour of the shell is pale to greenish, flecked with purplish-brown markings (often encrusted with light pink coralline algae). The operculum is smooth to faintly granular with pale green centre. (Richmond, 1997).

The solid, imperforate shell has a depressed-turbinate shape with a diameter greater than the altitude. It is covered with an irregular spiral series of nodules and granules, of which the subsutural series and two on the median portion of the body whorl are more prominent. The spire is depressed, dome-shaped with an apex that is frequently eroded and red. The shell contains 4 to 5 whorls, the last very large. The large aperture is round and iridescent within. The wide columella is flattened and excavated, deflexed recurved and somewhat channelled at its base, The inside of the operculum is flat, greenish and golden, iridescent, with about 5–6 whorls and a subcentral nucleus. Its outside is convex, greenish, sparsely granulate all over.

The species is subject to a wide variation. The passage from the strongly tuberculate forms into those in which the transverse striae simply cut the lirae into diamonds or granules is made by imperceptible degrees.

Habitat
This species can be found in the upper eulittoral zone, in pools or under stones.

Distribution
This marine species occurs in the Red Sea, off Southeast Africa, the Mascarene Basin and in the Indo-Pacific.

References

 Dautzenberg, Ph. (1929). Contribution à l'étude de la faune de Madagascar: Mollusca marina testacea. Faune des colonies françaises, III(fasc. 4). Société d'Editions géographiques, maritimes et coloniales: Paris. 321–636, plates IV-VII pp.
 Herbert D.G. (1988). Studies on Priotrochus obscurus and the systematics position of Priotrochus (Mollusca: Gastropoda: Trochidae). Journal of zoology 214: 561–268. 
 
 Alf A. & Kreipl K. (2003). A Conchological Iconography: The Family Turbinidae, Subfamily Turbininae, Genus Turbo. Conchbooks, Hackenheim Germany.
 Nakano T., Takashashi K. & Ozawa T. (2007) Description of an endangered new species of Lunella (Gastropoda: Turbinidae) from the Ogasawara Islands, Japan. Venus 66(1–2): 1–10.

External links
 

coronata
Gastropods described in 1791
Taxa named by Johann Friedrich Gmelin